Des Clark (born 4 March 1972) is an Australian former rugby league footballer.

Playing career
Originally from Toowoomba, Queensland, Clark joined the Western Suburbs Magpies in 1991 but did not play first grade for the club. In 1993, Clark joined the North Sydney Bears. In Round 5 of the 1994 NSWRL season Clark made his first grade debut in the Bears' 36–8 win over the Gold Coast Seagulls. Later that season, Clark made a mid-year switch to the Balmain Tigers, playing 10 games for them that season.

In 1995, Clark joined the Gold Coast Seagulls (and later Chargers), playing 27 games for the club over three seasons. In 1997, Clark played in the Chargers' first finals series, scoring a try in their major qualifying final loss to the Sydney City Roosters.

In 1998, he signed with the Halifax Blue Sox for the 1998 Super League season. Clark played 27 games for Halifax that season, scoring five tries. Clark played 24 games for Halifax in the 1999 season, before making a late season move to St. Helens. He left St Helens during their run to the Grand Final to join French club AS Carcassonne.

In 2000, Clark returned to Australia, playing two games for the North Queensland Cowboys.

Statistics

NSWRL/ARL/NRL
 Statistics are correct to the end of the 2000 season

Super League/Challenge Cup

References

1972 births
Living people
Australian rugby league players
Balmain Tigers players
Gold Coast Chargers players
Halifax R.L.F.C. players
North Queensland Cowboys players
North Sydney Bears players
Rugby league players from Toowoomba
Rugby league props
St Helens R.F.C. players